Jo's Boys is a British television mini-series which aired in 1959 on the BBC. It was based on the novels Little Men (1871) and Jo's Boys (1886) by Louisa May Alcott, and consisted of seven episodes. Cast included Annabelle Lee, Michael Caridia, Kenneth Collins, Lily Kann, Richard Palmer, George Pravda, Jimmy Ray, William Simons, and Donald Wilson. Unlike many BBC series of the 1950s, the episodes still exist, though it has yet to be given a DVD release.

References

External links
Jo's Boys at IMDb

1959 British television series debuts
1959 British television series endings
1950s British drama television series
Black-and-white British television shows
English-language television shows
Television series set in the 19th century
BBC television dramas
Television shows based on American novels
1950s British television miniseries
Works based on Little Women
Little Men